O'Connor Park  is a GAA stadium in Tullamore, County Offaly, Ireland.  It is one of the principal grounds of the Offaly GAA Gaelic football and hurling teams. It is known for sponsorship reasons as Bord na Móna O’Connor Park.

The ground was opened in 1934, to replace Ballyduff Park, and currently has a capacity of 18,000.

The ground currently consists of a covered stand on one side of the pitch, with terracing on the other three.  A stand was built in 1991, but replaced by the current structure in 2006. The stand (currently known as the 'New Stand' pending decision on a new name) was completed in 2006. It seats 7,000 people and also includes a press box and a special section for wheelchair users. Its 10 sections are each split horizontally with green, white and gold colour seats (the colours of Offaly GAA), with the words '' (the Irish for Offaly) spelt out across the stand's white section. At the same time as the stand was being constructed, improvements were also made in the terracing on the opposite side of the pitch, allowing it to comfortably hold 8,000 people. Plans also included building new dressing rooms, toilet facilities and a TV camera room on the terrace side of the ground. Further development was due to take place on the Arden End, with hybrid terrace/seating. Underneath the main stand is a cafe that is open on matchdays. 

The ground is owned by Tullamore GAA club, but was leased out by the Offaly County Board for 35 years in 2002 for use in inter-county matches.

See also
 List of Gaelic Athletic Association stadiums
 List of stadiums in Ireland by capacity

References

Buildings and structures in Tullamore
Gaelic games grounds in the Republic of Ireland
Offaly GAA
Sport in Tullamore
Sports venues in County Offaly